Les Karellis is a ski resort in the Maurienne Valley, located in the commune of Montricher-Albanne, in the Savoie department in the Auvergne-Rhône-Alpes region.

The station was opened in 1975.

References

External links

Official English site
Les Karellis ski resort guide

Ski areas and resorts in France
Sports venues in Savoie
Tourist attractions in Savoie